HD 205739 is a yellow-white hued star in the southern constellation of Piscis Austrinus, positioned near the western constellation boundary with Microscopium. It has the proper name Sāmaya, which was selected in the NameExoWorlds campaign by Sri Lanka, during the 100th anniversary of the IAU. Sāmaya means peace in the Sinhalese language.

With an apparent visual magnitude of 8.56, this star requires a small telescope to view. It is located at a distance of approximately 302 light years from the Sun based on stellar parallax, and is drifting further away with a radial velocity of +9 km/s This star has an absolute magnitude of 3.42.

HD 205739 is an ordinary F-type main-sequence star with a stellar classification of F7 V. This indicates that, like the Sun, it is generating energy through core hydrogen fusion. The star is 2.8 billion years old with an inactive chromosphere and is spinning with a projected rotational velocity of 4 km/s. It has 1.3 times the mass of the Sun and 1.6 times the Sun's radius. The abundance of iron is 60% greater than in the Sun, suggesting a higher metallicity. The star is radiating 3.5 times the luminosity of the Sun from its photosphere at an effective temperature of 6,276 K.

A Jupiter-like planet has been detected in an eccentric orbit around this star via Doppler spectroscopy. The maximum surface temperature of the planet is ~400 K, varying by 100 K over the course of an orbit. There is a data trend in the results which may point to an additional companion further from its star, but this will require a longer observation period to validate.

See also
 HD 154672

References

F-type main-sequence stars
Planetary systems with one confirmed planet
Piscis Austrinus
Durchmusterung objects
205739
106824